The Handover Gifts Museum of Macao is a museum to commemorate the transfer of sovereignty over Macau in Sé, Macau, China.

History
The construction of the museum started in March 2003 and was completed in October 2004. The museum was then officially opened on 30 December 2004.

Architecture
The museum is a three-story building. The first floor is the lobby, entrance and administrative offices of the museum. The second floor is the handover gifts exhibition gallery and the special exhibition gallery. The third floor is the auditorium.

Exhibitions
The museum exhibits auspicious gifts given by the 56 ethnic groups of China to celebrate the establishment of the special administrative region of Macau.

See also
 List of museums in Macau

References

External links

 

2004 establishments in Macau
Museums established in 2004
Museums in Macau
Sé, Macau